Carlos Miguel Fitz-James Stuart y Silva, 14th Duke of Alba, GE (19 May 1794 – 7 October 1835) was a Spanish aristocrat.

Biography
Born in Madrid, Spain, in 1794, he was a descendant of James FitzJames, 1st Duke of Berwick and through him, the exiled King James II of England & VII of Scotland. He was the second surviving son of the 5th Duke of Berwick and inherited that family's titles on his elder brother the 6th Duke's death in 1795. He was also a Knight of the Order of the Golden Fleece of Spain.

In 1819, he married the Italian noblewoman Rosalia Ventimiglia di Grammonte y Moncada (Palermo, 1798–1868). from the Ventimiglia, Princes of Grammonte, in Palermo. 
He became the 14th Duke of Alba in 1802 following the death of the childless 13th Duchess of Alba — he thus became a Grandee of Spain on ten counts. 

They had three children :
 Jacopo Fitz-James Stuart y Ventimiglia, Palermo, Italy, (1821–1881) who married in 1844 with Maria Francisca Portocarrero Palafox y Kirkpatrick (1825–1860), eldest sister of Eugénie de Montijo (1826–1920), Spanish wife of Emperor Napoleon III of France (1808–1873).
 Enrique Fitz-James Stuart y Ventimiglia, Count of Galve (5 October 1826 - 28 April 1882), since his father death in 1835. He married in 1871 Adelaida Ivanovna Basilevskaya. 
This title of Count of Galve was awarded by the first time in 1557. This title came back not to Enrique's nephew Jacobo Fitz-James Stuart, 15th Duke of Alba, deceased 1881, but to the 16th Duke of Alba since 1881, Jacobo's oldest son Carlos María Fitz-James Stuart, 16th Duke of Alba.
 Luis Fernando FitzJames-Stuart y Ventimiglia.

Carlos Miguel Fitz-James Stuart died aged 41 on 7 October 1835, in Sion, Switzerland, and was succeeded as Duke of Alba on that year by his eldest son.

Spanish titles
14th Duke of Alba, Grandee of Spain 1st Class
7th Duke of Liria and Jérica, Grandee of Spain 1st Class
10th Count-Duke of Olivares
12th Duke of Huéscar
7th Duke of Montoro
13th Marquess of Villanueva del Río
12th Marquess of Carpio
10th Marquess of Eliche
14th Count of Gelves

Jacobite titles
7th Duke of Berwick
7th Earl of Tinmouth
7th Baron Bosworth

Sicilian titles
17th Count of Modica

Ancestry
Carlos Miguel Fitz-James Stuart was a direct descendant of the King James II of England through his illegitimate son James FitzJames, 1st Duke of Berwick by his mistress Arabella Churchill.

References 

1794 births
1835 deaths
19th-century Italian nobility
Carlos Miguel
Dukes of Huéscar
Carlos Miguel
Grandees of Spain
Marquesses of Carpio
Berwick, Carlos Miguel Fitz-James Stuart, 7th Duke of
19th-century Spanish nobility